Thomas Principe, also known as the ".22 Caliber Killer", was an Italian-American Gambino crime family street soldier and close friend of John Gotti from New York City Alleged to have been part of a special hit squad that would order executions with silencer-equipped .22 caliber pistols, earning them the title in the newspapers as "the .22 Caliber hitters".  alleged members considered to make up the team of executioners were thought by the Federal Bureau of Investigation (FBI) to be Vincent Gigante, John DiGilio, Salvatore Briguglio and Principe. The team of "hitters" were suspected of being responsible for at least twenty gangland executions since 1976, including six FBI informants and potential witnesses. The most publicized murder, claimed to have been the team's 21st victim, was former Manhattan assistant District Attorney Gino Gallina. Gallina had become a lawyer, defending major crime figures including East Coast Genovese crime family members. He was gunned down in gangland style on a Greenwich Village street. Seven bullets riddled Gallina and he died ninety minutes later. At the time, Gallina was a key witness before a Newark, New Jersey grand jury, testifying, among other things, on Mafia executions performed by the suspected ".22 Caliber Hitters". He was claimed a victim of the team of executioners even though the bullets that killed him were from a .38-caliber handgun. Federal officials blamed his slaying on a leak from the grand jury.

References
Hoffman, William and Headley, Lake, Contract Killer: The Explosive Story of the Mafia's Most Notorious Hit Man Donald "Tony The Greek" Frankos
Ianuzzi, Joe, Joe Dogs: The Life and Crimes of A Gangster Simon & Schuster (June 1993) 

Year of birth missing
Year of death missing
Gambino crime family
Mafia hitmen
Murdered American gangsters of Italian descent
People murdered in New York City
Male murder victims
Deaths by firearm in Manhattan